Crime is present in various forms in China. The Chinese government does not release unified exact statistics on crime rates and the rate of criminal offending due to such information being considered sensitive. Scarce official statistics released are the subject of much academic debate due to allegations of statistical fabrication, under-reporting and corruption.

History
A distinguishing feature of the Qin empire was its treatment of criminals: harsh but careful and fair. Succeeding dynasties moderated the law in various ways.  In Ming times, commercialization and urbanization meant that scams abounded. Fences who disposed of stolen goods throve.
The People's Republic of China was established in 1949 and, from 1949 to 1956, underwent the process of transferring the means of production to common ownership. During this time, the new government worked to decrease the influence of criminal gangs and reduce the prevalence of narcotics and gambling. Efforts to crack down on criminal activity by the government led to a decrease in crime.

Between 1949 and 1956, larceny, arson, rape, murder, and robbery were major nonpolitical offenses. The majority of economic crimes were committed by business people who engaged in tax evasion, theft of public property, and bribery.

Government officials also engaged in illegal economic activity, which included improperly taking public property and accepting bribes. Between 1957 and 1965, rural areas experienced little reported crime. Crime rates increased later. The year 1981 represented a peak in reported crime. This may have been correlated to the economic reform in the late 1970s, which allowed some elements of a market economy and gave rise to an increase in economic activity. Below is a comparison of reported cases of crime from 1977 to 1988 (excluding economic crimes):

Crime by youth increased rapidly in the 1980s. Crime by youths consisted 60.2% of total crime in 1983, 63.3% in 1984, 71.4% in 1985, 72.4% in 1986, and 74.3% in 1987. The number of fleeing criminals increased over the years. Economic crimes have increased in recent years. From 1982 to 1988, the total number of economic crimes were 218,000.

In 1989, a total of 76,758 cases of economic offenses were registered, which included bribery, smuggling, and tax evasion. The changes in economic policy had an influence on the characteristics of criminality. Since the Second Plenary Session of the Eleventh Central Committee of the Chinese Communist Party, crime has increased and diversified.

Crime by type

Murder 
In 2011, the reported murder rate in China was 1.0 per 100,000 people, with 13,410 murders. The murder rate in 2018 was 0.5.  The reported murder rates have been criticized for under-reporting unsolved murders due to police salaries being based on the rate of solved cases.

Corruption 

The PRC is a one-party state ruled by the Chinese Communist Party. Corruption exists in China, and the resulting costs to the economy are significant. Between 1978 and 2003, an estimated $50 billion was smuggled out of the country by corrupt officials.

Human trafficking 

There are instances of human trafficking reported in China for various purposes. The majority of trafficking in PRC is internal, and this domestic trafficking is the most significant human trafficking problem in the country.

Domestic and transnational criminal organizations carry out sex trafficking in China. Women are lured through false promises of legitimate employment into commercial sexual exploitation in Taiwan, Thailand, Malaysia, Pakistan, and Japan. Chinese men are smuggled to countries throughout the world for exploitative labor. Women and children are trafficked into PRC from Mongolia, Burma, North Korea, Russia, and Vietnam for forced labor and sexual slavery.

Drug trade 

PRC is a major transshipment point for heroin produced in the Golden Triangle. Growing domestic drug abuse is a significant problem in PRC. Available estimates place the domestic spending on illegal drugs to be $17 billion.

Domestic violence 

China has a high rate of domestic violence. In 2004, the All-China Women’s Federation compiled survey results to show that thirty percent of the women in China experienced domestic violence within their homes.

In 2015, the Chinese government enacted the Anti-domestic Violence Law.

Crime dynamics

Illegal guns 
From January to July 1996, approximately 300,000 illegal small arms were seized from fourteen provinces of the country.

See also
Crime in Hong Kong
Law enforcement in China
List of Chinese criminal organizations
Prostitution in China
Terrorism in China

References